Glipostena nigricans is a species of beetle in the genus Glipostena. It was discovered in 2000.

References

Mordellidae
Beetles described in 2000